Allez Hopp is a 1946 East German film directed by Hans Fritz Köllner. It is set in a circus.

Cast
 Ernst Stahl-Nachbaur as Urmann
 Babsi Schultz-Reckewell as Claudia
 Alfred Cogho as Freddy
 Hilde Körber as Paula Urmann
 Paul Henckels as Schallinger
 Herbert Wilk as Dr. Raimund
 Hans Klering as Fred Matsu
 Aribert Grimmer as Direktor Holl
 Sonja Ziemann as Patsy
 Lili Schoenborn-Anspach 	as Scheuerfrau

References

External links
 

1946 films
East German films
1940s German-language films
Circus films
German black-and-white films
1946 drama films
1940s German films